Fa'atonu Fili (born 31 August 1981) is a Samoan rugby union footballer. He plays as a fly-half.

Fili played his first the Samoa national rugby sevens team in 2001, and later played at the 2002 and 2006 Commonwealth games. He later played for the 
Samoa national rugby union team at the 2003 Rugby World Cup. After years of obscurity he played rugby for Wellington Lions in the Air New Zealand Cup in 2009, becoming 1st choice fly half and earning a recall for Samoa. He continued this late revival in his career, again playing for Wellington in 2010 and 2014. Fili was also named in the 1999 RWC squad although he did not play any games.

Fili joined the Kandy Sports Club in the Sri Lankan Domestic Rugby Season 2013-2014.

In 2017 he played his 200th game for Marist St Pats.

In 2019 a Wellington rugby sevens tournament was named after him.

References

External links
 
 Fa'atonu Fili profile at IRB 2003 World Cup official website

Living people
Samoan rugby union players
1981 births
Samoa international rugby union players
New Zealand sportspeople of Samoan descent
New Zealand expatriate rugby union players
Samoan expatriate rugby union players
Expatriate rugby union players in Japan
Samoan expatriate sportspeople in Japan
New Zealand expatriate sportspeople in Japan
Hanazono Kintetsu Liners players
Wellington rugby union players
Rugby union players from Wellington City
Samoa international rugby sevens players